The Bogotá Formation (E1-2b, Tpb, Pgb) is a geological formation of the Eastern Hills and Bogotá savanna on the Altiplano Cundiboyacense, Eastern Ranges of the Colombian Andes. The predominantly shale and siltstone formation, with sandstone beds intercalated, dates to the Paleogene period; Upper Paleocene to Lower Eocene epochs, with an age range of 61.66 to 52.5 Ma, spanning the Paleocene–Eocene Thermal Maximum. The thickness of the Bogotá Formation ranges from  near Tunja to  near Bogotá. Fossils of the ungulate Etayoa bacatensis have been found in the Bogotá Formation, as well as numerous reptiles, unnamed as of 2017.

Etymology 
The formation was first described by Hettner in 1892, then by Hubach in 1931, 1945 and 1957, and named in 1963 by Julivert after the Colombian capital Bogotá and its savanna.

Description

Lithologies 
The Bogotá Formation consists mainly of grayish-red, locally purplish, commonly greenish-gray, generally poorly stratified mudstone and silty claystone. Lithic arenite sandstone lenses, ranging from fine- to medium-grained, generally friable and variegated, are local constituents. Carbonaceous material is present as thin beds of low-grade argillaceous coal, north of Bogotá. Fossil remains of Etaoya bacatensis, named after Colombian geologist Fernando Etayo and the indigenous name for the Bogotá savanna, Bacatá, have been found in Ciudad Bolívar, close to the type locality of the Bogotá Formation. Additionally, macroflora of Palaeophytocrene hammenii, named after Dutch botanist Thomas van der Hammen, and pollen of Foveotriletes margaritae, Proxapertites operculatus and Foveotricolpites perforatus have been found, used for dating the formation. Other pollen and flora, as Ulmoideipites krempii, Carpolithus, Anemocardium margaritae, and Hickeycarpum peltatum have been found in the Bogotá Formation. The abundant paleosols of the Bogotá Formation show an increase in chemical weathering across the Paleocene-Eocene (P-E) transition; the Paleocene–Eocene Thermal Maximum.

Later analysis has found several other species, such as pleurodire turtles, found at the Doña Juana dump, dyrosaurid mesoeucrocodylians, boid snakes, dipnoan fishes, frogs, lizards, sebecid crocodyliforms and 11 fossils of mammals. The find of a derived snake in the Lower Eocene section of the formation represents the oldest New World record. The finds of iguanians, including the fossil record of hoplocercines, and boine, caenophidian, and ungaliophiine snakes, indicate a tropical forest environment, present just before the Early Eocene Climatic Optimum (EECO). The faunal distribution has been correlated to the Carodnia-, Amphidolops-, and Wainka-bearing Peñas Coloradas Formation of the Golfo San Jorge Basin in Patagonia, Argentina.

Stratigraphy and depositional environment 
The Bogotá Formation, with a thickness of  close to Tunja to  near Bogotá, overlies the Cacho Formation and is overlain by the Regadera Formation. The age has been estimated to be Late Paleocene to Early Eocene. The middle part of the succession has been dated using detrital zircons at 56.2 ± 1.6 Ma. The spread of ages based on zircons has been reported from 60.96 ± 0.7 to 53.6 ± 1.1 Ma. The Bogotá Formation is laterally equivalent with the shales of the Socha Formation, the San Fernando Formation, the El Limbo Formation, Los Cuervos Formation, and the fossil-rich Cerrejón Formation of La Guajira.

Outcrops 

The Bogotá Formation is apart from its type locality, found in the synclinals of the Río Frío, Checua-Lenguazaque, Sesquilé, Sisga, Subachoque, around Lake Suesca, in the Tenza Valley, and in the synclinals of Teusacá and Usme. The campus of the Universidad La Javeriana has the Bogotá Formation as solid basement rock.

The Bogotá Formation forms the footwall of the eastward compressional Chicamocha Fault, and the footwall of the westward thrusting Bogotá Fault.

Regional correlations

Itaboraian correlations

See also 
 Geology of the Eastern Hills
 Geology of the Ocetá Páramo
 Geology of the Altiplano Cundiboyacense

Notes and references

Notes

References

Bibliography

Maps

External links 
 

Geologic formations of Colombia
Paleogene Colombia
Paleocene Series of South America
Eocene Series of South America
Casamayoran
Riochican
Itaboraian
Peligran
Selandian Stage
Thanetian Stage
Ypresian Stage
Fossiliferous stratigraphic units of South America
Paleontology in Colombia
Mudstone formations
Siltstone formations
Sandstone formations
Shale formations
Formations
Formations
Formations